The 2016 FC Cincinnati season was the club's first season of existence, and their first in United Soccer League, the third-tier of the American soccer pyramid. FC Cincinnati play in the Eastern Division of USL. On April 16, the club set the USL's regular season attendance record, with 20,497. They broke this record twice more later in their season, first on May 14 with 23,375 attendees, then again on September 17 with an attendance of 24,376. On July 20, with five games left, the club broke the USL's single season attendance record.

Club

Coaching staff

Roster 

 Casey Townsend joined the team on September 8, 2016, after the season had already started
  Where a player has not declared an international allegiance, nation is determined by place of birth.
 Last updated: September 18, 2016

Competitions

USL

Results summary

Results table

Standings

Statistics

Appearances

 Last updated: August 3, 2016

Goals

 Last updated: October 5, 2016

Clean Sheets

 Last updated: October 5, 2016

References

External links 
 

2016 USL season
American soccer clubs 2016 season
2016 in sports in Ohio
2016